The Haunting of Hiram C. Hopgood is a children's novel written in 1987 by Eva Ibbotson. The novel was published in the United States as The Haunting of Granite Falls.

The main characters are Alex and Helen, along with several ghosts. Other characters include Helen's father, the ghost of a hand and a sinister trio.

References

1987 British novels
1987 children's books
British children's novels
Novels by Eva Ibbotson
Ghost novels